Future Leaders Exchange (FLEX) is a scholarship student exchange program administered by the U.S. Department of State through funding from the Freedom Support Act. The program provides opportunities for high school students (ages 15–19) from Eurasia, mainly from the former Eastern Bloc,  to spend a year in the United States, living with a host family and attending an American high school. In 2019 program includes Armenia, Azerbaijan, the Czech Republic, Estonia, Georgia, Greece, Hungary, Kazakhstan, Kyrgyzstan, Latvia, Lithuania, Moldova, Mongolia, Montenegro, Poland, Romania, Serbia, Slovakia, Tajikistan, Turkmenistan, and Ukraine. The program seeks to develop the leadership abilities and cultural awareness.

The competition is intense. Only about one in fifty applicants are ultimately selected.

The program was created in 1992 after former Senator Bill Bradley’s conviction "that the best way to ensure long-lasting peace and understanding between the U.S. and Eurasia is to enable young people to learn about democracy firsthand through experiencing it". Since its inception in 1993, more than 18,000 high school students from 12 Eurasian countries (two more countries which used to participate in the program are Belarus and Uzbekistan) have studied in the U.S. under the program.

Initially the program included states from the former Soviet Union. In recent years, it has expanded to include countries in the Balkans and both central and eastern Europe, in addition to Mongolia.

On 1 October 2014 Russia pulled out of the programme. Russian students remaining in the US were allowed by the Russian side to complete their scholarship, and in the next editions, Russian students will be replaced by students from Ukraine and other countries.

The motive behind Russia's decision to end the cooperation was the case of a 16 year old student who had refused to return to Russia and searched for asylum in the USA on the grounds of his sexual orientation. He had met a homosexual couple and asked them for help to stay in the USA. He was put under the couple's tutelage. Russian officials criticized the USA for lack of responsibility towards Russian students.

Notable alumni 
 Marina Verenikina, '95 alumna, Los Angeles-based singer and musician
 Elena Milashina, '94 alumna, Russian investigative journalist for Novaya Gazeta
 Sergi Kapanadze, '97 alumnus, deputy speaker of Georgia's Parliament
 Andriy Shevchenko, '94 alumnus, Ukrainian politician and journalist, former member of the Verkhovna Rada
 Aysel Teymurzada, '05 alumna, Azerbaijani pop and R&B singer.
 Rosa Linn, '18 alumna, Armenian Eurovision contestant and pop singer.

See also
 Congress-Bundestag Youth Exchange
 Youth Exchange and Study Programs
 CIS FLEX Community (Russian and also International version)
 CIS Blogs Finalists

External links
 Future Leaders Exchange (FLEX) program website
 American Council's FLEX page
 Former Recruiter's website about FLEX in  Kyrgyzstan
 Uzbekistan registers US NGO in new breakthrough

References 

Student exchange
Bureau of Educational and Cultural Affairs